Psychoanalysis: The Impossible Profession is a 1981 book about psychoanalysis by the journalist Janet Malcolm. It was published by Alfred A. Knopf. The book received positive reviews.

Summary
Malcolm discusses the work of a psychoanalyst whom she refers to as "Aaron Green", concealing his real name through the use of a pseudonym. She describes his patients and teaching job at a local medical school, the influence of the psychoanalysts Charles Brenner and Jacob Arlow on his theory and technique, and his dismissal of other trends in psychoanalysis, such as those associated with Jacques Lacan, Otto Kernberg, Heinz Kohut, and Melanie Klein. "Green" reveals much of the inner politics of the New York Psychoanalytic Institute, to which he is attached. He also explores the challenges to his brand of ego psychology that were being presented by the British Object relations theory, and by such American figures as Kernberg and Kohut, in the late 20th century.

Publication history
Based on material originally published in The New Yorker, Psychoanalysis: The Impossible Profession was published by Alfred A. Knopf in 1981.

Reception
Psychoanalysis: The Impossible Profession received positive reviews from Joseph Adelson in The New York Times and Moss L. Rawn in Psychoanalytic Psychology. The book  was also reviewed by Dianne F. Sadoff in The Antioch Review and Joseph L. DeVitis in the Journal of Thought, and discussed by the journalist Mary-Kay Wilmers in the London Review of Books. Malcolm discussed the book in an interview with the journalist Gaby Wood in The Daily Telegraph.

Adelson credited Malcolm with providing an accurate discussion of psychoanalysis, including "a lucid and accurate account" of its "current doctrinal disputes" and a "a chilling depiction" of its politics as an organized movement. He also believed that she conveyed "the claustral atmosphere of the profession". He concluded that Psychoanalysis: The Impossible Profession was an "artful book" in which Malcolm showed "a keen eye for the surfaces - clothing, speech and furniture - that express character and social role."

Wilmers described the book as a "very striking" book of reportage.

The historian Peter Gay described Psychoanalysis: The Impossible Profession as a "witty and wicked" work that had been justly praised by psychoanalysts as "a dependable introduction to psychoanalytic theory and technique". He added that it had "the rare advantage over more solemn texts of being funny as well as informative."

See also
 D. W. Winnicott
 Lady with lapdog
 Margaret Mahler

References

Bibliography
Books

 
 

Journals

 
 
 
 

Online articles

 
 

1981 non-fiction books
American non-fiction books
Books about psychoanalysis
Books by Janet Malcolm
English-language books